Hotedršica (in older sources Hotedražica) is a village west of Logatec in the Inner Carniola region of Slovenia.

Geography
Hotedršica includes the hamlets of Griče (in older sources: V Gričih) to the north, Koš to the east, and Čajna and Log to the south. Hotedršica lies in the middle of the Hotedršica Lowland, a low-lying area extending toward Kalce to the southeast and Godovič to the northwest with karst springs and sinkholes in the surrounding foothills.

Name
Hotedršica was first attested in written sources in 1421 as Kathedresicz (and in 1496 as Kathedersicz). The name is a syncopated form of *Hotedražica, derived from the personal name *Xotědragъ (from *xotěti 'to desire' + *dorgъ 'good').

Church
The parish church in the settlement is dedicated to John the Baptist and belongs to the Ljubljana Archdiocese.

References

External links

Hotedršica on Geopedia

Populated places in the Municipality of Logatec